Myra Marx Ferree (born October 10, 1949) is a former professor of sociology and director of the Center for German and European Studies at the University of Wisconsin–Madison, where she was also a member of the Women's Studies Program. In 2005 she was a Berlin Prize Fellow at the American Academy in Berlin and in 2004 the Maria-Jahoda Visiting Professor at the Ruhr University Bochum.  Ferree retired in 2018.

Life 
Ferree attended Harvard University where she obtained a PhD in social psychology and social relations in 1976.

She has written numerous articles about feminist organizations and politics in the US, Germany and internationally, as well as about gender inequality in families, the inclusion of gender in sociological theory and practice, and the intersections of gender with race and class.  Her current work focuses on comparisons between US and German feminist movements and gender policy developments since the 1960s as well as the development of feminist identities in transnational women's organizations.

She has been the recipient of the Jessie Bernard Award (sociology's highest honor for work in gender), vice-president of the American Sociological Association and deputy editor of its leading journal, American Sociological Review, president of Sociologists for Women in Society and recipient of its mentoring and feminist scholarship awards.

Works (selection) 

Global Feminism: Transnational Women's Activism, Organizing, and Human Rights, New York : New York University Press, 2006 (eds. with Aili Mari Tripp)
 Shaping Abortion Discourse: Democracy and the Public Sphere in Germany and the United States, Cambridge University Press, 2001 (eds. with William Anthony Gamson, Jürgen Gerhards, and Dieter Rucht)
 Controversy and Coalition: The New Feminist Movement Across Four Decades of Change, Routledge Press, 1995 (with Beth Hess)
 Revisioning Gender, Alta Mira Press, 1998 (eds. with Judith Lorber and Beth Hess) 
 Feminist Organizations: Harvest of the New Women's Movement, Temple University Press, 1995 (eds. with Patricia Yancey Martin)

References

External links
 Myra Marx Ferree at University of Wisconsin–Madison, Department of Sociology

1949 births
Living people
Gender studies academics
American women sociologists
Postmodern feminists
University of Wisconsin–Madison faculty
Harvard Graduate School of Arts and Sciences alumni